Guntakandla Jagadish Reddy (born 18 July 1965), often referred to by his initials, GJR, is an Indian politician currently serving as  Minister of Energy of Telangana since 2 June 2014. He is a Member of the Telangana Legislative Assembly from Suryapet constituency. He is also a member of TRS party politbureau..

Early life
Born to Ramachandra Reddy and Savithri in Nagaram Village, Arvapally Mandal, Suryapet district, Telangana State, India, he has four siblings. He graduated as a B.A. from Sri Venkateshwar Degree College, Suryapet (Osmania University) in 1985. He did his Bachelor of Law from Siddartha Law College, Vijayawada, Nagarjuna University. He stood as a student leader, activist and emerged as a political leader.

Career
He was a practicing lawyer in Nalgonda district court. He was the 1st BAR Association President of the Nalgonda district.

Politics
He joined Telangana movement in 2001 and was one of the early members in Telangana Rashtra Samithi.

He contested from Huzurnagar constituency in 2009 and later in 2014 General elections from Suryapet Assembly Constituency and won the election. He won the Suryapet assembly constituency for the second time in 2018 Telangana assembly elections.

References

|-

|-

Telangana Rashtra Samithi politicians
People from Suryapet
Living people
State cabinet ministers of Telangana
Members of the Telangana Legislative Council
Telangana MLAs 2014–2018
1966 births